
Year 781 (DCCLXXXI) was a common year starting on Monday  of the Julian calendar. The denomination 781 for this year has been used since the early medieval period, when the Anno Domini calendar era became the prevalent method in Europe for naming years.

Events 
 By place 

 Europe 
 King Charlemagne has his son Carloman (renamed Pepin) anointed "King of Italy", and he is crowned by Pope Adrian I with the Iron Crown of Lombardy. His younger brother Charles I is anointed king of Aquitaine, and Louis the Pious (only 3-years old) is appointed sub-king of Italy and Aquitaine, following the conversion of Aquitaine from a Duchy to a sub-kingdom.
 Charlemagne meets Alcuin, Anglo-Saxon missionary, in Italy, and invites him to Aachen, where he becomes Charlemagne's chief adviser on religious and educational matters (approximate date).
 The Frankish currency called the livre carolingienne is minted for the first time (approximate date).

 Asia 
 Yang Yan, Chinese statesman, commits suicide after being accused of bribery and corruption. He is credited with reforming the tax system for peasants, reducing the power of the aristocratic classes, and eliminating their tax-free estates.
 April 30 – Emperor Kōnin of Japan abdicates the throne after an 11-year reign, in favour of his half-Korean son, Kanmu.
 July 31 – The oldest recorded eruption of Mount Fuji occurs (Traditional Japanese date: July 6, 781).
 New city of Bian (汴) is constructed on the site of Kaifeng during the Tang Dynasty (China).
 Marriage of Abbasid prince Harun ibn al-Mahdi (future caliph Harun al-Rashid) and Zubaidah bint Ja'far.

 By topic 

 Religion 
 Charlemagne defines the Papal territory (see Papal States). He codifies the regions over which the pope would be temporal sovereign: the Duchy of Rome is expanded by Ravenna, the Duchy of the Pentapolis, parts of the Duchy of Benevento, Tuscany, Corsica and Lombardy. 
 Nestorians in China build Christian monasteries, and erect the Nestorian Stele (approximate date).

Births 
 Harith al-Muhasibi, founder of the Baghdad School of Islamic philosophy, and a teacher of the Sufi masters Junayd al-Baghdadi and Sari al-Saqti (d. 857)

Deaths 
 Alchmund, bishop of Hexham (approximate date)
 King Fergus mac Echdach of Dál Riata (Scotland)
 Guo Ziyi, general of the Tang Dynasty (b. 697)
 Isonokami no Yakatsugu, Japanese nobleman (b. 723)
 Yang Yan, chancellor of the Tang Dynasty (b. 727)

References